The Electoral district of South Bourke (sometimes Bourke South) was an electoral district of the Legislative Assembly in then Australian colony of Victoria.
It was one of the original 36 electoral districts of the Assembly. 
It covered an area east of Melbourne, bounded by Dandenong Creek in the south and east, Moorabbin, Prahran and Hawthorn in the west and Templestowe in the north. It was abolished in 1889.

Members for South Bourke
Two members originally, one after the redistribution of 1877.

 = resigned
 = by election

Keys went on to represent the new Electoral district of Dandenong and Berwick from April 1889.

References

Former electoral districts of Victoria (Australia)
1856 establishments in Australia
1889 disestablishments in Australia